Vitumnus is a genus of assassin bugs (family Reduviidae), in the subfamily Harpactorinae.

Species
 Vitumnus leoninus Bergroth, 1907
 Vitumnus oculatus Stål, 1865
 Vitumnus scenicus (Stål, 1855)

References

Reduviidae
Cimicomorpha genera